This is a list of the Bishops and Archbishops of Novgorod the Great from the Christianization of Rus' in 988 to the establishment of the Metropolitanate in Novgorod in 1589.

Bishops of Novgorod 989–1163
 Ioakim Korsunianin  (c. 989–1030)
 Efrem  (1030–1035) – never consecrated
 Luka Zhidiata  (1035–1060)
 Stefan  (1060–1068)
 Fedor  (1069–1077)
 German  (1078–1095)
 Nikita  (1096–1108)
 Ioann Pop'ian  (1110–1130)	(d. 1144)
 Nifont  (1130–1156) – held archiepiscopal title personally
 Arkady  (1156–1163)

Archbishops of Novgorod the Great and Pskov 1165–1589
 Ilya (Ioann)  (1165–1186)
 Gavril (Grigory)  (1186–1193)
 Martiry Rushanin  (1193–1199) –only a bishop
 Mitrofan  (1199–1211, 1219–1223)
 Antony  (1211–1219, 1226–28, 1229)
 Arseny  (1223–1225, 1228–1229) – never consecrated
 Spiridon  (1229–1249)
 Dalmat  (1249–1274)
 Kliment  (1274–1299)
 Feoktist  (1299–1308) (d. 1310)
 David  (1309–1325)
 Moisei  (1325–1330, 1352–1359) (d. 1363)
 Vasilii Kalika  (1331–1352)
 Aleksei  (1359–1388) (d. 1390)
 Ioann  (1388–1415) (d. 1417)
 Simeon  (1415–1421)
 Feodosy  (1421–1423) (d. 1425)–never consecrated
 Evfimy I  (1423–1429)
 Evfimy II  (1429–+03/20/1458)
 Iona  (1458–11/05/1470)
 Feofil  (1470–1480) (d. 1482/84?)
 Sergei (1483–1484) (d.1504)
 Gennady (1484–1504) (d. 1505)
 Serapion (1506–1509) (d. 1516)
1509–1526 Vacancy
 Makary (1526–1542) became Metropolitan of Moscow (d. 1563)
 Feodosii (1542–1551)
 Serapion II (1551–1552)
 Pimen (1552–1571)
 Leonid (1571–1575)
 Aleksandr (1576–1591) – elevated to Metropolitan dignity, 1589

References
Arseny Nasonov, ed. Novgorodskaia Pervaia Letopis' , 474; Aleksandr Khoroshev, Tserkov' v sotsialno–politicheskoi istorii Novgorodskoi feodal'noi respubliki (Moscow, 1986).
Michael C. Paul, "A Man Chosen by God": The Office of Archbishop in Novgorod, Russia 1165–1478. Ph.D. Dissertation University of Miami 2003. Appendix, p. 320.

External links
 List of Novgorodian Prelates.

Novgorod

Novgorod
Bishops and archbishops of Novgorod
Novgorod Bishops and archbishops